Herbert Morsley Wharton  (born 1936) is an Indigenous Australian former stockman turned writer.  Wharton began publishing poetry and yarn-like novels in his fifties, for which he is  now an recognised internationally.

Biography
Wharton is a Murri man: his maternal grandmother was Kooma and both grandfathers Irish. He was born in Cunnamulla, Queensland in 1936.

Wharton and his work have recognised in a number of ways. In 2012, Wharton received the 'Australia Council Award for Lifetime Achievement in Literature': a $50,000 award for eminent writers who have made outstanding and lifelong contributions to Australian literature. In 2013, Wharton was a recipient of the Queensland Greats Awards. In the 2020 Queen's Birthday Honours, Wharton was made a Member of the Order of Australia (AM) for "significant service to the literary arts, to poetry, and to the Indigenous community".

The Fryer Library houses the Herb Wharton manuscript collection which contains working and completed drafts of writings, poetry (published and unpublished), correspondence, diaries, speeches, taped video and audio interviews, and miscellaneous notes.

Works
Novels
 Unbranded (UQP, 1992) 
 Yumba Days (UQP, 1999) 

Short stories
 Cattle Camp: Murri Drovers and their Stories (UQP, 1994)
 Where Ya Been Mate? (1996)

Poetry
 Kings With Empty Pockets (2003)  Review
 Imba (Listen): Tell You a Story (2003)

References

1936 births
People from Cunnamulla
Australian poets
Australian male novelists
Australian male short story writers
Indigenous Australian writers
Living people
Queensland Greats
Members of the Order of Australia
Australian stockmen